Youngs Creek is a stream in Johnson County, Indiana, in the United States.

It was named for Joseph Young, who owned land in the area in the 1820s.

See also
List of rivers of Indiana

References

Rivers of Johnson County, Indiana
Rivers of Indiana